Felipe Lima may refer to:

 Felipe Lima (swimmer) (born 1985), Brazilian swimmer
 Felipe Lima (footballer) (born 1989), Brazilian footballer